Drupa clathrata, common name : the clathrate drupe, is a species of sea snail, a marine gastropod mollusk in the family Muricidae, the murex snails or rock snails.

Subspecies
 Drupa clathrata clathrata (Lamarck, 1816)
 Drupa clathrata miticula (Lamarck, 1822) (species inquirenda)

Description
The shell size varies between 19 mm and 40 mm

Distribution
This species is distributed in the Indian Ocean along Madagascar and in the South West Pacific Ocean.

References

 Dautzenberg, Ph. (1929). Mollusques testaces marins de Madagascar. Faune des Colonies Francaises, Tome III
 Houart R., Kilburn R.N. & Marais A.P. (2010) Muricidae. pp. 176–270, in: Marais A.P. & Seccombe A.D. (eds), Identification guide to the seashells of South Africa. Volume 1. Groenkloof: Centre for Molluscan Studies. 376 pp.
 Claremont M., Reid D.G. & Williams S.T. (2012) Speciation and dietary specialization in Drupa, a genus of predatory marine snails (Gastropoda: Muricidae). Zoologica Scripta 41: 137–149

External links
 

clathrata
Gastropods described in 1816